Martin John Docherty-Hughes (born 21 January 1971) is a Scottish National Party politician. He has been the Member of Parliament (MP) for West Dunbartonshire since 2015.

Early life and education
Docherty-Hughes was raised by his parents in Clydebank, and began working from the age of 16. He studied at the Glasgow College of Food Technology, now City of Glasgow College, graduating with an HND in Business Administration in 1997. He subsequently obtained a degree in Politics from the University of Essex and attended the Glasgow School of Art for his master's degree. On finishing his studies Martin returned to Clydebank and worked for a decade for the West Dunbartonshire Community and Volunteering Services (WDCVS).

Political career
He joined the Scottish National Party in 1991, and was elected the following year as Scotland's youngest councillor to the-then Clydebank District Council in May 1992, at the age of 21, until 31 March 1996. He was elected to the third seat of the Anderston/City ward of the Glasgow City Council on 3 May 2012 polling 1,057 votes and 19.9% and exceeding the quota on the second count, becoming a Bailie until 14 May 2015.

In February 2015, he was selected as the SNP candidate for the West Dunbartonshire constituency in the 2015 UK general election. He defeated incumbent Gemma Doyle, winning 30,198 votes and 59% of the vote. As a consequence of his election to Parliament, he stepped down from his position on Glasgow City Council.

He changed his name from Docherty to Docherty-Hughes after getting married in January 2016.

The descendant of a woman from Ballinglen, County Mayo and a man from Stralongford in County Donegal, he is also a relative of Ian McGarvey and has many relatives scattered around Philadelphia and New York.

Was appointed as Chief Whip following the 2022 SNP Westminster Group Leadership contest by new leader, Stephen Flynn.

References

External links 
 Personal website
 Profile on SNP website

 
 

1971 births
Alumni of the Glasgow School of Art
Alumni of the University of Essex
Councillors in Glasgow
Gay politicians
LGBT members of the Parliament of the United Kingdom
Scottish LGBT politicians
Living people
Members of the Parliament of the United Kingdom for Scottish constituencies
People from Clydebank
Place of birth missing (living people)
Scottish National Party councillors
Scottish National Party MPs
UK MPs 2015–2017
UK MPs 2017–2019
UK MPs 2019–present
Scottish people of Irish descent